Nafissatou is a feminine given name. Notable people with the name include:

 Nafissatou Dia Diouf (born 1973), Senegalese writer in French
 Nafissatou Diallo, maid at the centre of the New York v. Strauss-Kahn case
 Nafissatou Moussa Adamou (born 1997), Nigerian swimmer
 Nafissatou Niang Diallo (1941–1982), Senegalese writer
 Nafissatou Thiam (born 1994), Belgian track and field athlete